Tallas is a surname. Notable people with the surname include:

Gregg G. Tallas (1909–1993), Greek film director
Rob Tallas (born 1973), Canadian ice hockey player